Carolina Cerqueda Santacreu (born November 7, 1985) is an Andorran former swimmer, who specialized in sprint freestyle events. She is a 2004 Olympian and currently holds three Andorran records each in the 50, 100, and 200 m freestyle. She is a former member of Club Natació Sabadell in Spain.

Cerqueda qualified for the women's 100 m freestyle at the 2004 Summer Olympics in Athens, by receiving a Universality place from FINA. Four months before the Games, she posted an invitation time of 1:00.62 at the European Championships in Madrid, Spain. She topped the first heat against Burundi's Larissa Inangorore and Benin's Gloria Koussihouede by a wide margin of 23 seconds, in her lifetime best of 1:00.38. Cerqueda failed to advance into the semifinals, as she placed forty-eighth overall in the preliminaries.

Notes

References

External links
 
 

1985 births
Living people
Andorran female swimmers
Olympic swimmers of Andorra
Swimmers at the 2004 Summer Olympics
Andorran female freestyle swimmers
People from Andorra la Vella